Rockbot is an American music group from Richmond, Virginia, with a sound self-defined as "Atari rock", combining synth pop, video game sound effects, and heavy metal music. As bassist Jonathan Sullivan, formerly with the group Jack's Mannequin,  and guitarist Clark Fraley joined together to form the band, they wished to feature a female singer, and were introduced to New York-based Apollo Smile. Reinforced by Bryan Stiglich on drums, Adam Thomas on Moog synthesizer, and guitarist Steve Burner, Rockbot went on to record debut extended play Joystick in 2002. In 2003, Smile departed the band and was replaced with Kelli Hoosack. That year, they released their first full-length, Atari Rock. In January 2004, Laura Thomas took the vocal role and also added keyboards.

In 2006, Thomas, Fraley  and guitarist Steve Burner left to form their own band, The Sort.

Discography

Atari Rock
"Know This"
"Blaze Green"
"Just Fine"
"Dennis Scott"
"Comes To Us"
"Cops"
"Passed Out"
"Without You"
"Bomb Song"
Artist:	Rockbot
Album:	Atari Rock
Released:	2003
Credits:
Jonathan Sullivan - vocals, bass
Kelli Hoosack - vocals
Clark Fraley - guitar
Steve Burner - guitar, vocals
Bryan Stiglich - drums
Adam Thomas - synth
Jenny Vasques - guest vocals on Bomb Song

Recorded by Laferrera @ the Recorditorium. Mastered by rainmaker
all songs copyright Rockbot 2003 except "You dropped a bomb on me".

Joystick
"Passed Out"
"Bong Song"
"Puzzle"
"Wack"
"Breathe"
Artist:	Rockbot
Album:	Joystick
Released:	2002
Credits:
Jonathan Sullivan - bass, vox, whammy bass
Clark Fraley - guitar
Apollo Smile - vox
Adam Thomas - moog, sinakone
"all guitars by C. Fraley"
"all synths by J.Sullivan, C.Fraley"
Brian Stiglich - drums
drums "passed out", "breathe", "puzzle" by Justin Riccio
drums "wack" by Bryan Stiglich
drums "bong song" by Tony Thaxton
drums "wack", "bong song" recorded by Ben Catania @ Digital pig studios, RVA
drums "passed out", "breathe", "puzzle" recorded by Jeremy Smith at The Slave Pit, RVA
vox recorded by Stephen Tjaden @ Funhouse Studios, NYC
mixed by lafff @ Sound of Music Studios, RVA
mastered by Chris Douthit @ Bump your head studios, RVA
everything else recorded @ teletran 1 studios, Oregon Hill

References

Musical groups from Virginia